Leema Dhar (Bengali লীমা ধর, Hindi लीमा धर) is an Indian author.

Personal life
Leema Dhar is undertaking a Ph.D in Feminism in Charlotte Brontë, Jane Eyre and Anne Brontë’s Agnes Grey from University of Allahabad.

Career
Dhar's first anthology of Hindi poems कुछ लफ्ज़ नक़ाब में (2007) was published when she was in her teens (9th standard). Her second book and the first anthology of English poems For The Hundred Tomorrows (2010) was published when she was 16.

In 2015 Dhar was invited to read from her works at the 28th International Conference on Globalization, Environment, Education and Culture: India and Canada, hosted by the University of Allahabad.

Works

References

Further reading

External links
http://www.anandabazar.com/national/lima-s-creations-drawing-attention-through-out-the-country-dgtl-1.402376

http://www.sweetsharing.com/sweet-talks-with-leema-dhar/
http://www.ucanindia.in/news/solidarity-movement-launches-new-national-youth-magazine/28161/daily
http://www.voicesnet.com/allpoemsoneauthor.aspx?memberid=1136910010
http://ireport.cnn.com/docs/DOC-910665
http://mattersindia.com/2015/03/new-publication-for-youth-launched/

English-language writers from India
1993 births
Indian women poets
Indian women novelists
Bengali writers
Living people
21st-century Indian poets
Poets from Uttar Pradesh
21st-century Indian women writers
21st-century Indian writers
21st-century Indian novelists
Women writers from Uttar Pradesh
Novelists from Uttar Pradesh